Ware County is a county located in the southeastern part of the U.S. state of Georgia. As of the 2020 census, the population was 36,251. The county seat and only incorporated place is Waycross.

Ware County is part of the Waycross, Georgia Micropolitan Statistical Area.

By geographic area, Ware County is the largest county in Georgia.

History

Ware County, Georgia's 60th county, was created on December 15, 1824, by an act of the Georgia General Assembly from land that was originally part of Appling County.

The county is named for Nicholas Ware, the mayor of Augusta, Georgia from (1819–1821) and  United States Senator who represented Georgia from 1821 until his death in 1824.

Several counties were later created from parts of the original Ware County borders:
 Bacon County (from portions of Appling, Pierce, and Ware counties in 1917)
 Charlton County (from portions of Camden and Ware county in 1854)
 Clinch County (from portions of Lowndes and Ware counties in 1850)
 Coffee County (from portions of Clinch, Irwin, Telfair, and Ware counties in 1854)
 Pierce County (from portions of Appling and Ware counties in 1857)

Ware County was home to Laura S. Walker (1861-1955) a noted author and conservationist. Walker promoted a comprehensive program of forestry activity, including the establishment of forest parks. She erected markers and monuments along old trails and at historic sites, in Waycross and Ware County so that local history would not be forgotten. Walker wrote three books about the land and history of her home. They are: History of Ware County, Georgia About "Old Okefenåok" and Doctors of Primitive Times and Horse and Buggy Days of Ware County.

An effort to recognize her work culminated in President Franklin D. Roosevelt issuing a proclamation to establish the Laura S. Walker National Park, located in Ware County, in her honor. She was the only living person for whom a state or national park was named. In 1937, the federal government purchased distressed farmland for the park. Work on the park was undertaken by the Works Progress Administration and the Civilian Conservation Corps. In 1941, the national park was deeded over to Georgia, becoming the State's 13th state park.

Geography
It is the largest county in Georgia by area. A large portion of the county lies within the Okefenokee Swamp and its federally protected areas.

More than half of Ware County, made up by the western half of the southern portion of the county, the land bridge to the northern portion of the county, and the southern and western portion of the northern section of the county, is located in the Upper Suwannee River sub-basin of the Suwannee River basin. The eastern half of the southern portion of Ware County is located in the St. Marys River sub-basin of the St. Marys-Satilla River basin. The rest of the county, from just southeast to north and west of Waycross, is located in the Satilla River sub-basin of the same St. Marys-Satilla River basin.

Major highways

  U.S. Route 1
  U.S. Route 1 Business
  U.S. Route 23
  U.S. Route 23 Business
  U.S. Route 82
  U.S. Route 84
  State Route 4
  State Route 4 Business
  State Route 38
  State Route 122
  State Route 158
  State Route 177
  State Route 520

Adjacent counties

 Bacon County - north
 Pierce County - east
 Brantley County - east
 Charlton County - southeast
 Baker County, Florida - south
 Clinch County - west
 Atkinson County - west
 Coffee County - northwest

National protected area
 Okefenokee National Wildlife Refuge (part)

Demographics

2000 census
As of the census of 2000, there were 35,483 people, 13,475 households, and 9,297 families living in the county. There were 15,831 housing units at an average density of 18 per square mile (7/km2). The racial makeup of the county was 69.65% White, 28.01% Black or African American, 0.18% Native American, 0.48% Asian, 0.03% Pacific Islander, 0.99% from other races, and 0.66% from two or more races.  1.94% of the population were Hispanic or Latino of any race.

According to the census of 2000, the largest ancestry groups in Ware County were English 46.13%, African 28.01%, Scots-Irish 12.29%, Scottish 4.3%, Irish 2.21% and Welsh 1.9%.

There were 13,475 households, out of which 30.70% had children under the age of 18 living with them, 50.30% were married couples living together, 14.80% had a female householder with no husband present, and 31.00% were non-families. 27.90% of all households were made up of individuals, and 12.30% had someone living alone who was 65 years of age or older.  The average household size was 2.47 and the average family size was 3.01.

In the county, the population was spread out, with 24.80% under the age of 18, 9.10% from 18 to 24, 28.10% from 25 to 44, 22.60% from 45 to 64, and 15.40% who were 65 years of age or older.  The median age was 37 years. For every 100 females, there were 97.60 males.  For every 100 females age 18 and over, there were 94.50 males.

The median income for a household in the county was $28,360, and the median income for a family was $34,372. Males had a median income of $26,910 versus $20,424 for females. The per capita income for the county was $14,384.  About 15.90% of families and 20.50% of the population were below the poverty line, including 30.10% of those under age 18 and 16.70% of those age 65 or over.

2010 census
As of the 2010 United States Census, there were 36,312 people, 13,654 households, and 9,209 families living in the county. The racial makeup of the county was 66.4% white, 29.5% black or African American, 0.8% Asian, 0.3% American Indian, 1.5% from other races, and 1.5% from two or more races. Those of Hispanic or Latino origin made up 3.3% of the population.

Of the 13,654 households, 33.3% had children under the age of 18 living with them, 44.6% were married couples living together, 17.7% had a female householder with no husband present, 32.6% were non-families, and 28.4% of all households were made up of individuals. The average household size was 2.48 and the average family size was 3.03. The median age was 38.4 years.

The median income for a household in the county was $35,517 and the median income for a family was $47,609. Males had a median income of $36,149 versus $27,034 for females. The per capita income for the county was $18,295. About 16.7% of families and 20.5% of the population were below the poverty line, including 32.5% of those under age 18 and 10.3% of those age 65 or over.

2020 census

As of the 2020 United States Census, there were 36,251 people, 13,823 households, and 8,909 families residing in the county.

Education

High schools
 Ware County High School, Waycross

Middle schools
 Ware County Middle School, Waycross
 Waycross Middle School, Waycross

Elementary schools
 Wacona Elementary School, Waycross
 Center Elementary School, Waycross
 Williams Heights Elementary School, Waycross
 Memorial Drive Elementary School, Waycross
 Ruskin Elementary School, Waycross
 Waresboro Elementary School, Waycross

Preschools
 DAFFODIL Preschool, Waycross

Private schools
 Southside Christian School

Higher education
 South Georgia State College, Waycross
 Coastal Pines Technical College, Waycross

Communities

City
 Waycross

Census-designated places
 Deenwood
 Sunnyside
 Waresboro
 Millwood
 Manor
 Dixie Union

Unincorporated communities
 Bickley
 Ruskin
 Jamestown

Politics

See also

 National Register of Historic Places listings in Ware County, Georgia
 Obediah Barber Homestead
 Laura S. Walker State Park
List of counties in Georgia

References

External links

 Official Ware County website
 Ware County Community Website & Community Calendar
 History of Ware County, Georgia - Laura S. Walker
 Doctors of Primitive Times and Horse and Buggy Days of Ware County - Laura S. Walker
 Georgia GenWeb Ware County site
 Okefenokee Swamp Park homepage
 Okefenokee National Wildlife Refuge U.S. Fish and Wildlife Service

 
Georgia (U.S. state) counties
1824 establishments in Georgia (U.S. state)
Populated places established in 1824
Waycross, Georgia micropolitan area